James Hanning was a professional footballer who played as an inside forward for Sunderland.

References

Association football inside forwards
Dalziel Rovers F.C. players
Sunderland A.F.C. players
Hamilton Academical F.C. players
English Football League players
Year of birth missing
Year of death missing
English footballers